The Nipigon Elks are a Canadian Junior B ice hockey team based in Nipigon, Ontario. They play in the Lakehead Junior Hockey League of Hockey Northwestern Ontario.

History
The Elks are five-time Western Canadian Brewers Cup champions. They won the Junior C tournament in 1997, 1998, 2000, 2001, and 2013 against comparable teams from across Western Canada.  The Elks were also 2010 finalists.

In 2008, the team changed their name from the Nipigon Elks to the Nip-Rock Elks. The name change, which was for just one season, had to do with an agreement with the neighboring town of Red Rock, Ontario.

2002–03
The Nipigon Elks finished off the 2002-03 season in first place with a record of 16-6-2 and went on to win the league playoffs. The Elks defeated the Wawa Travellers of the North of Superior Junior B Hockey League to win the Northern Ontario Regional Junior B Hockey Championship for the right to compete at the 2003 Keystone Cup in St. Claude, Manitoba.

The Elks first game of the Western Canadian Junior B championship was against the Assiniboia Southern Rebels, a 6-1 loss. They next played the Selkirk Fishermen, resulting in a 9-3 loss. In the third game, the Elks lost to the Spruce Grove Regals 11-2, then lost to the Richmond Sockeyes 5-1. In the fifth and final game of the round robin, the Elks lost to the host St. Claude Knights 5-1 to close out their tournament winless.

Season-by-season standings

Keystone Cup history
Western Canadian Jr. B Championships (Northern Ontario to British Columbia)Six teams in round robin play. 1st vs 2nd for gold/silver; 3rd vs 4th for bronze.

References

External links
Nipigon Elks website

Ice hockey teams in Ontario
Lakehead Junior Hockey League teams
Sport in Northern Ontario